Kaila Methven (born 1994) is an American fashion and lingerie designer.

Life and career
Kaila was born in Santa Monica, California. She lived with her mother Lisa Methven, until her mother's death. Later she moved to Paris to live with her father. She trained in art of design at the ESMOD and earned her master's degree from the IFA Paris. Later, She did her MBA in Luxury Brand Management at the Polimoda.

Kaila is founder of Madame Methven. She debuted her collection at LA Fashion Week. Since then, she has  been featured in magazines, including Maxim US. Kaila won Best International Designer of the year awards, Haute Couture Lingerie and Haute couture Pret A Porter. Her designs have been seen on many celebrities, including Katharine McPhee, Demi Lovato, Apollonia Kotero, Kitty Brucknell and cast members of The Real Housewives of Beverly Hills. She is also an LGBT activist.

KFC Heiress 
In 1960, Kaila's maternal grandfather, Stanley Methven, founded a company, Rainbow Chicken Unlimited, which in the 1980s at one time supplied 90% of the chicken sold by Kentucky Fried Chicken. Following the release of the KFC-produced short film, A Recipe for Seduction, Vanity Fair noted of Methven:

Methven found aspects of the film itself to be "very vulgar and definitely not something that the Methven family would ever approve of".

Filmography

Accolades 
 2016 - Prêt à porter Gold Award, International Design Awards
 2016 - lingerie Silver Award, International Design Awards
2018 - Global Designer of The Year Award

References

External links
 
 

Living people
American fashion designers
1991 births